Pleshkov or Pleshkoff is a Russian surname that may refer to:
Andrey Pleshkov (born 1982), Olympic rower from Belarus 
Mikhail Pleshkov (?-1956), Russian Olympic equestrian
Mikhail Mikhailovich Pleshkov (1856–1927), Russian general
Julia Pleshkova (born 1997), Russian Olympic alpine skier
Olga Pleshkova (born 1956), Russian Olympic speed skater